Tetrasquilla is a genus of mantis shrimp containing a single species, Tetrasquilla mccullochae. It is the only known pantropical stomatopod. The specific epithet commemorates Dr. Irene A. McCulloch, professor of zoology of the University of Southern California.

References

Stomatopoda
Crustaceans of the eastern Pacific Ocean
Crustaceans of the Atlantic Ocean
Monotypic arthropod genera
Pantropical fauna
Taxa named by Raymond B. Manning